King Tai Court is the first Green Form Subsidised Home Ownership Scheme court developed by the Hong Kong Housing Authority and located at King Fuk Street, San Po Kong of Wong Tai Sin District, Kowloon, Hong Kong. It commenced in June 2017.

Since it is built along the busy Prince Edward Road East, fixed windows are installed in flats facing the road side to block the roadway noise as far as possible. Other amenities include retail, ancillary parking space, recreational facilities, property management office, and supported hostel for physically disabled (Pleasure Place).

Education
King Tai Court is in Primary One Admission (POA) School Net 43. Within the school net are multiple aided schools (operated independently but funded with government money) and Wong Tai Sin Government Primary School.

Nearby Buildings
 Diamond Hill station
 Kai Tak station
 Rhythm Garden
 Choi Hung Estate
 The Latitude
 Kai Ching Estate

References

Home Ownership Scheme
Residential buildings completed in 2017
San Po Kong